The 1991 Georgetown Tigers football team was an American football team that represented Georgetown College of Georgetown, Kentucky, as a member of the Mid-South Conference (MSC) during the 1991 NAIA Division II football season. In their tenth season under head coach Kevin Donley, the Tigers compiled a 13–1 record (6–0 against conference opponents) and won the NAIA national championship, defeating , 28–20, in the NAIA Championship Game.

Schedule

References

Georgetown Tigers
Georgetown Tigers football seasons
NAIA Football National Champions
Georgetown Tigers football